Gallion, originally known as Macon Station, was a plantation owned by Henry Augustine Tayloe on the Demopolis to Uniontown Rail Line in Hale County, Alabama. It is now known as Gallion to honor Jo Gallion, a railroad official, and is an unincorporated community in the aforementioned county. Gallion has a post office with a ZIP code of 36742. Gallion has one site on the National Register of Historic Places, a plantation house known as Waldwic.

In 1867, an African-American community named Freetown was established near Gallion.

Geography

Notable person
Benjamin Minge Duggar, botanist, discoverer of tetracycline
Henry Augustine Tayloe, founder of Macon Station, which later became Gallion

Climate
The climate in this area is characterized by hot, humid summers and generally mild to cool winters.  According to the Köppen Climate Classification system, Gallion has a humid subtropical climate, abbreviated "Cfa" on climate maps.

References

Unincorporated communities in Alabama
Unincorporated communities in Hale County, Alabama